Lawrence Gilman Roberts (December 21, 1937 – December 26, 2018) was an American engineer who received the Draper Prize in 2001 "for the development of the Internet", and the Principe de Asturias Award in 2002.

As a program manager and later office director at the Advanced Research Projects Agency, Roberts and his team created the ARPANET using packet switching techniques invented by British computer scientist Donald Davies and American Paul Baran. The ARPANET, which was built by the Massachusetts-based company Bolt Beranek and Newman (BBN), was a predecessor to the modern Internet. He asked Leonard Kleinrock to apply mathematical models to simulate the performance of the network. Roberts later served as CEO of the commercial packet-switching network Telenet.

Early life and education
Roberts, who was known as Larry, was born and raised in Westport, Connecticut. He was the son of Elizabeth (Gilman) and Elliott John Roberts, both of whom had doctorates in chemistry. It is said that during his youth, he built a Tesla coil, assembled a television, and designed a telephone network built from transistors for his parents' Girl Scout camp.

Roberts attended the Massachusetts Institute of Technology (MIT), where he received his bachelor's degree (1959), master's degree (1960), and Ph.D. (1963), all in electrical engineering. His Ph.D. thesis "Machine Perception of Three-Dimensional Solids" was in the field of computer vision.

Career

MIT 
After receiving his PhD, Roberts continued to work at the MIT Lincoln Laboratory.  Having read the seminal 1961 paper of the "Intergalactic Computer Network"  by  J. C. R. Licklider, Roberts developed a research interest in time-sharing using computer networks.

ARPA 
In 1967, although at first reluctant, he was recruited by Robert Taylor in the ARPA Information Processing Techniques Office (IPTO) to become the program manager for the ARPANET. He asked Frank Westervelt to explore the initial design questions for a network. Roberts prepared a proposal that all host computers would connect to one another directly. Taylor and Wesley Clark disagreed with this design and Clark suggested the use of dedicated computers to create a message switching network, which were later called Interface Message Processors. 

At the Symposium on Operating System Principles that year, Roberts presented the plan based on Clark's message switching proposal. There he met a member of Donald Davies's team (Roger Scantlebury) who presented their research on packet switching and suggested it for use in the ARPANET. Roberts applied Davies's concepts of packet switching for the ARPANET, and sought input from Paul Baran. 

Roberts' plan for the ARPANET was the first wide area packet-switching network with distributed control, similar to Donald Davies' 1965 design. ARPA issued a request for quotation (RFQ) to build the system, which was awarded to Bolt, Beranek and Newman (BBN). Significant aspects of the networks's operation including routing, flow control, software design and network control were developed by the BBN IMP team, which included Bob Kahn. Roberts managed its implementation and contracted with Leonard Kleinrock in 1968 to carry out mathematical modelling of the packet-switched network's performance. Roberts engaged Howard Frank to consult on the topological design of the network. Frank made recommendations to increase throughput and reduce costs in a scaled-up network. When Robert Taylor was sent to Vietnam in 1969 and then resigned, Roberts became director of the IPTO. 

In 1970, he proposed to NPL's Donald Davies that the two organizations connect their networks via a satellite link. This original proposal proved infeasible, but in 1971 Peter Kirstein agreed to Roberts' proposal to connect his research group at University College London (UCL) instead. UCL provided interconnection with British academic networks, forming the first international resource sharing network. Roberts proposed in 1973 that it would be possible to use a satellite's 64 kilobit/second link as a medium shared by multiple satellite earth stations within the beam's footprint. This was implemented later by Bob Kahn, and resulted in SATNET. 

The Purdy Polynomial hash algorithm was developed for the ARPANET to protect passwords in 1971 at the request of Roberts.

Roberts approached AT&T in the early 1970s about taking over the ARPANET to offer a public packet switched service but they declined.

Telenet 
In 1973, Roberts left ARPA to join BBN's effort to commercialize the nascent packet-switching technology in the form of Telenet,  the first FCC-licensed public data network in the United States. He served as its CEO from 1973 to 1980. Roberts joined the international effort to standardize a protocol for packet switching based on virtual circuits shortly before it was finalized. Telenet converted to the X.25 protocol, which was adopted by PTTs across North America and Europe for public data networks in the mid-late 1970s. Roberts promoted this approach over the datagram approach in TCP/IP being pursued by ARPA, which he described as "oversold" in 1978.

Later career 
In 1983 he joined DHL Corporation as President. At the time, he predicted bandwidths would go down driven by voice compression technology.

He was CEO of NetExpress, an Asynchronous Transfer Mode (ATM) equipment company, from 1983 to 1993. Roberts was president of ATM Systems from 1993 to 1998.  He was chairman and CTO of Caspian Networks, but left in early 2004; Caspian ceased operation in late 2006.

, Roberts was the founder and chairman of Anagran Inc. Anagran continues work in the same area as Caspian: IP flow management with improved quality of service for the Internet.

Since September 2012, he was CEO of Netmax in Redwood City, California.

Personal life
Roberts married and divorced four times. At the time of his death, his partner was physician Tedde Rinker. Roberts died at his California home from a heart attack on December 26, 2018.

Awards and honors
 IEEE  Harry H. Goode Memorial Award (1976 ), "In recognition of his contributions to the architectural design of computer-communication systems, his leadership in creating a fertile research environment leading to advances in computer and satellite communications techniques, his role in the establishment of standard international communication protocols and procedures, and his accomplishments in development and demonstration of packet switching technology and the ensuing networks which grew out of this work."
 Member, National Academy of Engineering (1978)
L.M. Ericsson Prize (1982) in Sweden
 Computer Design Hall of Fame Award (1982)
 IEEE W. Wallace McDowell Award (1990),  "For architecting packet switching technology and bringing it into practical use by means of the ARPA network."
 Association for Computing Machinery  SIGCOMM Award (1998), for "visionary contributions and advanced technology development of computer communication networks".
 IEEE Internet Award (2000) For "early, preeminent contributions in conceiving, analyzing and demonstrating packet-switching networks, the foundation technology of the Internet."
 International Engineering Consortium Fellow Award (2001)
 National Academy of Engineering Charles Stark Draper Prize  (2001), "for the development of the Internet"  
 Principe de Asturias Award 2002 in Spain "for designing and implementing a system that is changing the world by providing previously unthought of opportunities for social and scientific progress."
 NEC C&C Award (2005) in Japan "For Contributions to Establishing the Foundation of Today's Internet Technology through ... the Design and Development of ARPANET and Other Early Computer Networks that were Part of the Initial Internet."
 In 2012, Roberts was inducted into the Internet Hall of Fame by the Internet Society.

See also
History of the Internet
Internet pioneers

References

Bibliography

External links
 Larry Roberts, "The ARPANET and Computer Networks", Computer History Museum, 1986
 Personal website
 Oral history interview with Lawrence G. Roberts.  Charles Babbage Institute, University of Minnesota.  Roberts directed the Information Processing Techniques Office (IPTO) during 1968–1973 and was later chief operating officer of Network Express. The interview focuses on IPTO and the Advanced Research Projects Agency. Much of Roberts's description of the work of ARPA and IPTO is set within the context of his interactions with Congress on budget matters. Topics include J. C. R. Licklider, Ivan Sutherland, Stephen J. Lukasik, Wesley Clark, ARPA and IPTO support of research in computer science, computer networks, and artificial intelligence, the ARPANET, the involvement of universities with ARPA and IPTO.
 Oral history interview with Robert E. Kahn.  Charles Babbage Institute, University of Minnesota.  Kahn discusses the work of various DARPA and IPTO personnel including J. C. R. Licklider, Vinton Cerf, and Larry Roberts
 Lawrence G. Roberts's profile on Internet Evolution, "the macrosite for news, analysis, & opinion about the future of the internet."
 "Obituary: Lawrence Roberts, Who Helped Design Internet’s Precursor, Dies at 81", Katie Hafner, New York Times, December 30, 2018.

1937 births
2018 deaths
People from Westport, Connecticut
MIT School of Engineering alumni
Internet pioneers
Draper Prize winners
Members of the United States National Academy of Engineering
MIT Lincoln Laboratory people
American people of English descent